Andrea Cingolani (born 14 August 1990) is an Italian artistic gymnast who won an individual bronze medal at the 2013 European Artistic Gymnastics Championships and a silver medal with the team at the 2022 European Men's Artistic Gymnastics Championships.

References

External links
 
 

1990 births
Living people
Italian male artistic gymnasts
Athletics competitors of Centro Sportivo Aeronautica Militare